Barron Gorge is a rural locality in the Cairns Region, Queensland, Australia. In the  Barron Gorge had a population of 0 people.

Springs is a neighbourhood in the narrow centre part of the locality.

Geography 
Almost the entire area of the locality is undeveloped land within the Barron Gorge National Park which also extends into a number of neighbouring localities. The land rises from approximately 10 metres above sea level to the east of the locality up to a number of named peaks, including:

 North Peak,  in the middle of the locality 
 Mount Williams, also known as Tokim Peak,  in the south of the locality
 Red Bluff, a cliff

The name of the locality derives from the gorge created by the Barron River through the Macalister Range and the Lamb Range.The Cairns-to-Kuranda railway line provides the north-western boundary of the locality and also part of the south-eastern locality. The railway line is used by the Kuranda Scenic Railway tourist service which includes stops at scenic lookouts. There were two railway stations on this line within the locality:

 Springs railway station, now abandoned.
 Stoney Creek railway station, situated where the railway line crosses Stoney Creek, a tributary of the Barron River

There is only one road through the locality, the Barron Gorge Road, which starts in Carvonica and Kamerunga and provides access to the Barron Gorge Hydroelectric Power Station.

History 
In the  Barron Gorge had a population of 0 people.

Attractions 
The Skyrail Rainforest Cableway passes through the locality with Red Peak Station, a stopping point within the locality which features guided boardwalk tours through ancient tropical rainforests, featuring a 400-year-old Kauri pine tree. There is no entry to the cableway from the locality; its terminals are in Smithfield and Kuranda.

References

External links 

Cairns Region
Localities in Queensland